Tasiusaq (old spelling: Tasiussaq) is an island settlement in the Avannaata municipality in northwestern Greenland. It had 252 inhabitants in 2020. In Kalaallisut, the name means "looks like a lake".

Upernavik Archipelago 

Tasiusaq is located on Tasiusaq Island within Upernavik Archipelago, a vast archipelago of small islands on the coast of northeastern Baffin Bay.

Population 
Tasiusaq is one of the few settlements in the Avannaata municipality exhibiting significant growth patterns over the course of the last two decades, increasing by nearly half relative to the 1990 levels and by over 7 percent relative to the 2000 levels.

Transport 
During weekdays Air Greenland serves the village as part of government contract, with flights from Tasiusaq Heliport to Innaarsuit Heliport and to Upernavik Airport.

References

Populated places in Greenland
Populated places of Arctic Greenland
Avannaata
Tasiusaq Bay
Upernavik Archipelago